Know Your Power: A Message to America's Daughters is a 2008 memoir by House Speaker Nancy Pelosi, published by Doubleday on July 29, 2008. It is co-written with New York Times best-selling author and Peabody Award-winning writer Amy Hill Hearth. It is Pelosi's first published book.

Background

The book is a personal and political history describing her own youth as the daughter of U.S. Congressman Thomas D'Alesandro, Jr., being a stay-at-home mom, becoming a Democratic organizer in California, running for Congress at 47 and eventually becoming the highest ranking woman in the history of the United States government at the time. Pelosi also writes about the experiences of other women to serve in Congress and opposition to the presidency and policies of George W. Bush. The book seeks to impart wisdom and re-inforce self-esteem in women of all ages.

The title comes from advice given to her by former Rep. Lindy Boggs.

Publishing history

Doubleday acquired rights to publish Pelosi's memoirs in July 2007, led by Doubleday president Stephen Rubin. Pelosi was represented by the William Morris Agency, including chairman Norman Brokaw, who said, "When I first met Nancy Pelosi twenty years ago, I could tell she was destined to make history. I told her to start taking notes." Publishers Weekly described the book as "a gentle account from a tough politician."

Publicity tour

Pelosi's promotional tour for the book in July 2008 included appearances on Today, The View and The Colbert Report.

References

External links
Know Your Power book listing by Random House
Know Your Power by Nancy Pelosi, readers' guide at Doubleday.com
Nancy Pelosi Airs Some Clean Laundry in Power Washington Post interview.

2008 non-fiction books
Books about American politicians
Political memoirs
Doubleday (publisher) books
Collaborative memoirs
Nancy Pelosi